The Tanagro (Tanàgro) or Negro is a river of the Province of Salerno, southwestern Italy. It rises in the Vallo di Diano and is a tributary of the Sele River. In ancient times it was known as Tanager.

Overview
From the origin to the mouth, the river flows in the municipal territories of Casalbuono, Montesano sulla Marcellana, Buonabitacolo, Sassano, Padula, Sala Consilina, Teggiano, San Rufo, Atena Lucana, Sant'Arsenio, San Pietro al Tanagro, Polla, Pertosa, Auletta, Petina, Buccino, Sicignano degli Alburni and Contursi Terme. It crosses the towns and villages of Casalbuono, Ascolese (Padula), Silla (Sassano), Atena Lucana Scalo, Polla, Pertosa (near the caves), Auletta, Sicignano Scalo and Contursi Scalo.

References

Cilento
Rivers of the Province of Salerno
Rivers of Italy
Drainage basins of the Tyrrhenian Sea